Live '88 is a live album by American singer-songwriter and musician Shawn Colvin, released in 1995.

Track listing
"Diamond in the Rough" (Shawn Colvin, John Leventhal) – 4:21
"Shotgun Down the Avalanche" (Colvin, Leventhal) – 4:00
"I Don't Know Why" (Colvin) – 3:54
"Cry Like an Angel" (Colvin, Leventhal) – 4:26
"Ricochet in Time" (Colvin) – 3:16
"Another Long One" (Colvin) – 3:18
"Stranded" (Colvin) – 4:31
"Something to Believe In" (Colvin, Leventhal) – 5:20
"Don't You Think I Feel It Too" (Dave Ball) – 3:25
"Kathy's Song" (Paul Simon) – 3:52
"Knowing What I Know Now" (Colvin, Leventhal) – 3:46

Personnel
Shawn Colvin – vocals, guitar
Production notes:
Carol Young – producer
Darleen Wilson – engineer
Chris Dixon – engineer
David Thoener – engineer, mixing
Steve Addabbo – remixing
Scott Hull – digital editing
Greg Calbi – mastering
Melissa Bailey – art direction
Jackson Browne – liner notes
A. Prack – photography

References

Shawn Colvin albums
Albums produced by John Leventhal
1995 live albums